Denys Molchanov and Igor Zelenay were the defending champions but chose not to defend their title.

Dan Added and Hernán Casanova won the title after defeating Davide Pozzi and Augusto Virgili 6–3, 7–5 in the final.

Seeds

Draw

References

External links
 Main draw

Internazionali di Tennis d'Abruzzo - Doubles
Internazionali di Tennis d'Abruzzo